Iñaki Barrenetxea Giraldez (born 28 November 1973, Bilbao, Basque Country) is a Basque former profesional road racing cyclist, who after his profesional carrer turned jury in races and organizer of Bizkaiko Bira. In his amateur years he was part of the Base selection and joined Ripolin Bondex team having as a director Joxean Fernandez Matxin and teammates Oscar Freire and David Seco.

His father was the president of Bizcay Cyclist Federation and his younger brother, Asier, is also a cyclist.

Major results 
1993
1st Bilbao
1994
 3rd Villasana de Mena
1995
 3rd Clásica Memorial Txuma
1996
 1st Berango (Criterium)

References

External Links 

1973 births
Living people
Spanish male cyclists
Cyclists from the Basque Country (autonomous community)
Sportspeople from Bilbao